"O Baby" is a song written and recorded by English rock band Siouxsie and the Banshees. It was produced by John Cale and released as the first single from the band's 11th studio album, The Rapture. Melody Maker wrote : "O Baby is the wonderful prelude to Rapture" and it is "deliciously pop".

Background, music and video
The song is much different musically and lyrically than almost all of Siouxsie and the Banshees' previous releases. It is an up-tempo love song with a skipping rhythm, light guitar work and straightforward, cheerful lyrics by Siouxsie Sioux ("...the cracks in the ground grin up at me / Even the creases in  my shoes smile up at me..."). The promotional video was shot in Flagstaff, Arizona at a beauty pageant with young girls: director John Hillcoat filmed it as a documentary.

The [B-side], "B Side Ourselves", was performed by the band during all the shows of their 1995 tour. The extra tracks were live acoustic versions of "Swimming Horses" and "All Tomorrow's Parties" (composed by the Velvet Underground), both recorded in December 1991 at a concert organized by radio station KROQ.

"O Baby" was the last Siouxsie and the Banshees single to hit the top 40, peaking at number 34 in the UK Singles Chart. It was also their last entry on the U.S. Modern Rock Tracks chart, where it reached number 21. Crossing over from the
alternative camp to daytime radio airplay, the song became a surprise hit on European radio, and topped the Polish Music chart [radio airplay] for three weeks - it was the most broadcast track on radio in Poland in February 1995.

Track listing
UK 7" single
 "O Baby"
 "B Side Ourselves"

 also released on cassette

UK CD single 1
 "O Baby"
 "B Side Ourselves"
 "O Baby (Manhattan Mix)"

UK CD single 2
 "O Baby"
 "Swimming Horses (Live)" (acoustic live version recorded at KROQ Radio on 21 December 1991)
 "All Tomorrow's Parties (Live)" (acoustic live version recorded at KROQ Radio on 21 December 1991)

Charts

References 

1995 singles
Siouxsie and the Banshees songs
Song recordings produced by John Cale
1995 songs